Sleepless in New York is a 2014 documentary film about heartbreak and how to overcome it by director and producer Christian Frei.

Summary 
The documentary film deals with lovesickness, often laughed off as nothing more than an affliction of adolescence. Oscar-nominated director Christian Frei and award-winning cinematographer Peter Indergand dive into the frenzied nights of three people who have recently been rejected: nights full of pain and tears, yet also of wakefulness and creativity. Anthropologist Dr. Helen Fisher reveals the processes that unfold in the brain of the lovesick. She says: "The game of love matters. It matters big time." Exploring the difficult path out of self-destructive, obsessive behavior, toward a new self, "Sleepless in New York" was promoted as "a film for those in love, out of love or looking for love."

Press

Release 
Festivals:
 Visions du Réel International Documentary Festival Nyon 2014
 Hot Docs International Documentary Festival Canada 2014
 DOK.fest International Documentary Film Festival Munich 2014
 PLANETE + DOC Film Festival Warsaw 2014
 DOCVILLE International Documentary Film Festival Belgium 2014
 EDOC Encounters of the Other Cinema Ecuador 2014

References

External links 
 
 

2014 documentary films
2014 films
Swiss documentary films
Love
Documentary films about New York City
Films directed by Christian Frei
Documentary films about mental health
2010s English-language films